The 2009–10 Minnesota Golden Gophers women's basketball team represented the University of Minnesota in the 2009–10 NCAA Division I women's basketball season. The Golden Gophers were coached by Pam Borton. The Golden Gophers, a member of the Big Ten Conference, finished last in the conference standings and did not advance to any national postseason tournament.

Offseason
May 5: The 2009–10 season will mark the third year of the Big Ten-ACC Basketball Challenge. On Thursday, December 3, the Golden Gopher will travel to Maryland to play the Maryland Terrapins.

Exhibition

Regular season

Roster

Schedule

Player stats

Postseason

NCAA basketball tournament

Awards and honors

Team players drafted into the WNBA

See also
2009–10 Minnesota Golden Gophers women's ice hockey team

References

External links
Official Site

Minnesota Golden Gophers women's basketball seasons
Minnesota
Minnesota Golden
Minnesota Golden